Route 336 is a collector road in the Canadian province of Nova Scotia.

It is located in the central part of the province and connects Upper Musquodoboit at Route 224 with Springside at Route 289 .

Communities

Upper Musquodoboit
Dean
Newton Mills
Eastville
Springside

See also
List of Nova Scotia provincial highways

References

Nova Scotia provincial highways
Roads in Colchester County
Roads in Halifax, Nova Scotia